Thomas McEllistrim (born 24 October 1968) is a former Irish Fianna Fáil politician who served as a Teachta Dála (TD) for the Kerry North constituency from 2002 to 2011. 

A schoolteacher by profession, McEllistrim was first elected to Dáil Éireann at the 2002 general election.

His father, Tom McEllistrim, and his grandfather, also called Tom McEllistrim both previously held the same seat. 

McEllistrim lost his Dáil seat at the 2011 general election. He was elected to Kerry County Council for the Tralee local electoral area at the 2014 local elections.

In March 2015, McEllistrim sought a Dáil nomination for Fianna Fáil for the new Kerry constituency but was defeated at the convention by fellow County Councillor, John Brassil. He contested the Seanad Éireann elections in April 2016 for the Industrial and Commercial Panel, but was again unsuccessful. He lost his council seat at the 2019 local elections.

See also
Families in the Oireachtas

References

 

1968 births
Living people
Alumni of St Patrick's College, Maynooth
Fianna Fáil TDs
Irish schoolteachers
Local councillors in County Kerry
Members of the 29th Dáil
Members of the 30th Dáil
Politicians from County Kerry